Einar Kalsæg (born 13 January 1979) is a retired Norwegian football striker.

He was a prolific goalscorer at Eidsvold Turn. Ahead of the 2004 season he joined Kongsvinger IL. In the summer of 2005 he was wanted by Strømsgodset IF, and after the season he moved there.
 He helped win promotion to the Norwegian Premier League, and got seven Norwegian Premier League games in 2007 without scoring. In August 2007 he was exchanged with Steffen Nystrøm, joining Moss FK. In 2010, he went on to FK Tønsberg, and in 2011 he became playing assistant coach of Lillehammer FK.

References

1979 births
Living people
People from Eidsvoll
Norwegian footballers
Eidsvold TF players
Kongsvinger IL Toppfotball players
Strømsgodset Toppfotball players
Moss FK players
Eliteserien players
Norwegian First Division players
Association football forwards
Sportspeople from Viken (county)